Chong Mek is a border town in the Isan region of Thailand. The town is the only land-based crossing open to most travellers from Thailand to Laos, the other such crossings being across the Mekong river. Vang Tao is the settlement on the Lao side.

The town has a busy market popular with Thai visitors, however its popularity has diminished since the opening of the bridge at Mukdahan in 2007.

Sights and attractions

References

Populated places in Ubon Ratchathani province